Viengthong district may refer to a few different districts in Laos.

Viengthong district, Bolikhamsai
Viengthong district, Houaphanh